Tom Stapleton (17 July 1907 – 18 October 1977) was an  Australian rules footballer who played with Geelong in the Victorian Football League (VFL).

Notes

External links 

1907 births
1977 deaths
Australian rules footballers from Victoria (Australia)
Geelong Football Club players
Chilwell Football Club players